Rosa 'Honor',  (aka JAColite ), is a white blend hybrid tea rose cultivar, developed by  William Warriner, and introduced into the United States by Jackson & Perkins in 1980.  The cultivar was the recipient of the Portland Gold Medal in 1978 and was an All-America Rose Selections winner in 1980.

Description
'Honor' is a medium-tall, upright shrub, 4 to 6 ft (121—182 cm) in height with a 2 to 4 ft (60—121 cm) spread. Blooms are large, with an average diameter of 4—5 in (10—12 cm). Flowers open from long, pointed buds and are bright white with light cream hues. The rose has a mild fragrance. Flowers have a double (16-25 petals), high-centered bloom form. Flowers are borne mostly solitary on long, thick  stems, in small clusters. Leaves are large, dark green, and bronzy-red when new foliage. 'Honor' blooms in flushes from spring through autumn. The plant does best in USDA zone 7b and warmer.

Child plants
'Honor' was used to hybridize the following plants:
 Rosa 'Aromatherapy', (2005)
 Rosa 'Signature', (1998 )
 Rosa 'Starla', (1990)

Awards 
 Portland Gold Medal, (1978)
 All-America Rose Selections (AARS), (1980)

See also
Garden roses
Rose Hall of Fame
List of Award of Garden Merit roses

References

Honor